The 1995 Scottish League Cup final was played on 26 November 1995, at Hampden Park in Glasgow and was the final of the 50th Scottish League Cup competition. The final was contested by Aberdeen and Dundee. Aberdeen won the match 2–0 thanks to goals by Billy Dodds and Duncan Shearer.

Match details

External links
 Soccerbase
 The Independent - Match Report

1995
League Cup Final
Scottish League Cup Final 1995
Scottish League Cup Final 1995
1990s in Glasgow